The 60th Dan Kolov & Nikola Petrov Tournament, is a wrestling event held in Sofia, Bulgaria between 2 and 5 March 2023.

This international tournament included competition in both men's and women's freestyle wrestling and men's Greco-Roman wrestling. This tournament was held in honor of Dan Kolov who was the first European freestyle wrestling champion from Bulgaria and European and World Champion Nikola Petroff.

Event videos
The event will air freely on the Bulgarian Wrestling Federation Live Youtube channel.

Competition schedule
All times are (UTC+2)

Medal table

Team ranking

Medal overview

Men's freestyle

Men's Greco-Roman

Women's freestyle

Participating nations 
384 wrestlers from 42 countries:

  (6)
  (1)
  (7)
  (7)
  (2)
  (9)
  (60)
  (1)
  (1)
  (1)
  (1)
  (1)
  (4)
  (9)
  (4)
  (1)
  (14)
  (12)
  (5)
  (5)
  (15)
  (3)
  (47)
  (20)
  (4)
  (6)
  (1)
  (2)
  (5)
  (7)
  (2)
  (6)
  (17)
  (1)
  (14)
  (3)
  (10)
  (4)
  (3)
  (23)
  (9)
  (31)

Results

Men's freestyle

Men's freestyle 57 kg
 Legend
 F — Won by fall
 WO — Won by walkover

Men's freestyle 61 kg
 Legend
 F — Won by fall

Men's freestyle 65 kg
 Legend
 F — Won by fall
 WO — Won by walkover

Men's freestyle 70 kg
 Legend
 F — Won by fall
 WO — Won by walkover

Men's freestyle 74 kg
 Legend
 F — Won by fall
 WO — Won by walkover

Men's freestyle 79 kg
 Legend
 F — Won by fall
 WO — Won by walkover

Men's freestyle 86 kg
 Legend
 F — Won by fall
 WO — Won by walkover

Final

Top half

Bottom half

Men's freestyle 92 kg
 Legend
 F — Won by fall
 WO — Won by walkover

Men's freestyle 97 kg
 Legend
 F — Won by fall
 WO — Won by walkover

Men's freestyle 125 kg
 Legend
 F — Won by fall

Men's Greco-Roman

Men's Greco-Roman 55 kg

Men's Greco-Roman 60 kg
 Legend
 F — Won by fall

Men's Greco-Roman 63 kg

Men's Greco-Roman 67 kg
 Legend
 F — Won by fall
 WO — Won by walkover

Men's Greco-Roman 72 kg
 Legend
 WO — Won by walkover

Men's Greco-Roman 77 kg
 Legend
 F — Won by fall
 WO — Won by walkover

Men's Greco-Roman 82 kg
 Legend
 F — Won by fall
 WO — Won by walkover

Men's Greco-Roman 87 kg
 Legend
 F — Won by fall
 WO — Won by walkover

Men's Greco-Roman 97 kg
 Legend
 F — Won by fall
 WO — Won by walkover

Men's Greco-Roman 130 kg
 Legend
 F — Won by fall
 WO — Won by walkover

References

External links 
 UWW Official Website
 Bulgarian Wrestling Federation
 Dan Kolov and Nikola Petrov - draw, results
 Results Book

2023 in European sport
2023 in sport wrestling
March 2023 sports events in Europe
2023 in Bulgarian sport
International wrestling competitions hosted by Bulgaria